Marcus Montagu Murphy (14 November 1914 – August 2007) was an English footballer who played as an inside forward.

Career
Murphy's early career was spent in South West England with St Austell, Plymouth & Stonehouse Gas and Plymouth United. During World War II, Murphy guested for Middlesbrough, before returning to Plymouth to sign for Plymouth Argyle. At Plymouth, Murphy made 15 Football League appearances for the club, scoring once. In 1947, following a period in Plymouth's reserves, Murphy signed for Chelmsford City.

References

1914 births
2007 deaths
Association football forwards
English footballers
Sportspeople from Tavistock
A.F.C. St Austell players
Plymouth United F.C. players
Middlesbrough F.C. wartime guest players
Plymouth Argyle F.C. players
Chelmsford City F.C. players
English Football League players